The upper (superior) trunk is part of the brachial plexus. It is formed by joining of the ventral rami of the fifth (C5) and sixth (C6) cervical nerves. The upper trunk divides into an anterior and posterior division.

The branches of the upper trunk from proximal to distal are:

 subclavian nerve (C5-C6)
suprascapular nerve (C5-C6)
anterior division of upper trunk (C5-C6, forms part of lateral cord)
posterior division of upper trunk (C5-C6, forms part of posterior cord)

The axillary, radial, musculocutaneous and median nerves all contain axons derived from the upper trunk.

Additional images

Nerves of the upper limb